Hassan Mirza Ali (born 18 June 1998) is a Bahraini handball player for Al-Najma and the Bahrain. He competed in the 2020 Summer Olympics.

References

1998 births
Living people
Bahraini male handball players
Olympic handball players of Bahrain
Handball players at the 2020 Summer Olympics
21st-century Bahraini people